The Four Pests campaign, was one of the first actions taken in the Great Leap Forward in China from 1958 to 1962. The four pests to be eliminated were rats, flies, mosquitoes, and sparrows. The extermination of sparrows is also known as the smash sparrows campaign or eliminate sparrows campaign, which resulted in severe ecological imbalance, being one of the causes of the Great Chinese Famine. In 1960, the campaign against sparrows was ended and redirected to bed bugs.

Campaign

The "Four Pests" campaign was introduced in 1958 as a hygiene campaign aimed to eradicate the pests responsible for the transmission of pestilence and disease:

 the mosquitos responsible for malaria
 the rodents that spread the plague
 the pervasive airborne flies
 the sparrows—specifically the Eurasian tree sparrow—which ate grain seed and fruit

Sparrows 
Sparrows were suspected of consuming approximately 2 kg (4 pounds) of grain per sparrow per year. Sparrow nests were destroyed, eggs were broken, and chicks were killed. Millions of people organized into groups, and hit noisy pots and pans to prevent sparrows from resting in their nests, with the goal of causing them to drop dead from exhaustion. In addition to these tactics, citizens also simply shot the birds down from the sky. The campaign depleted the sparrow population, pushing it to near extinction within China.

Some sparrows found a refuge in the extraterritorial premises of various diplomatic missions in China. The personnel of the Polish embassy in Beijing denied the Chinese request of entering the premises of the embassy to scare away the sparrows who were hiding there and as a result the embassy was surrounded by people with drums. After two days of constant drumming, the Poles had to use shovels to clear the embassy of dead sparrows.

Effects
By April 1960, Chinese leaders changed their opinion in part due to the influence of ornithologist Tso-hsin Cheng who pointed out that sparrows ate a large number of insects, as well as grains. While the campaign was meant to increase yields, concurrent droughts and floods as well as the lacking sparrow population decreased rice yields. In the same month, Mao Zedong ordered the campaign against sparrows to end. Sparrows were replaced with bed bugs, as the extermination of sparrows had upset the ecological balance, which subsequently resulted in surging locust and insect populations that destroyed crops due to a lack of a natural predator.

With no sparrows to eat them, locust populations ballooned, swarming the country and compounding the ecological problems already caused by the Great Leap Forward, including widespread deforestation and misuse of poisons and pesticides. Ecological imbalance is credited with exacerbating the Great Chinese Famine. The Chinese government eventually resorted to importing 250,000 sparrows from the Soviet Union to replenish their population.

See also

 Emu War
 Tax on trees
 List of campaigns of the Communist Party of China

References

External links
 PBS series The People's Century – 1949: The Great Leap
 China follows Mao with mass cull (BBC)
 Catastrophic Miscaculations

1958 in China
1962 in China
1958 in the environment
Campaigns of the Chinese Communist Party
Environmental disasters in China
Great Leap Forward
Pest control campaigns